Aïn El Hadjel District is a district of M'Sila Province, Algeria.

Municipalities
The district is further divided into 2 municipalities:
Aïn El Hadjel
Sidi Hadjeres

District of M'Sila Province